Władysław Augustyn Stasiak (15 March 1966 – 10 April 2010) was a senior official and politician of the Republic of Poland.

Biography 

Władysław Stasiak was born in Wrocław. He made history studies in Wrocław University, and got the National School of Public Administration (Krajowa Szkoła Administracji Publicznej) diploma in Warsaw in 1993.

He was Interior and Administration minister within Kaczyński cabinet from 8 August 2007 to 16 November 2007) and became Chief of the Chancellery of the President of the Republic of Poland starting 27 July 2009.

He died in the 2010 Polish Air Force Tu-154 crash on 10 April 2010.

Honours and awards
  Grand Cross of the Order of Merit (Portugal, September 2008)
 Commander's Cross of the Order of Merit of the Republic of Hungary (19 March 2009)
 Commander's Cross with Star of the Order of Polonia Restituta (posthumously, 16 April 2010)
 Honorary Citizen of Wroclaw (20 May 2010)
 Merit for the City of Warsaw (9 September 2010)
 Honorary Citizen of Lower Silesia (9 September 2010)

1966 births
2010 deaths
Burials at Powązki Military Cemetery
Victims of the Smolensk air disaster
Politicians from Wrocław
Interior ministers of Poland
Commanders with Star of the Order of Polonia Restituta
Grand Crosses of the Order of Merit (Portugal)
Commander's Crosses of the Order of Merit of the Republic of Hungary (civil)
University of Wrocław alumni
Polish Roman Catholics
National School of Public Administration (Poland) alumni